Ran Salu (In Sinhala: The Yellow Robe) is a 1967 Sri Lankan drama film directed by Lester James Peries. The film follows the parallel paths of Sujatha (Punya Heendeniya) and Sarojini Perera (Anula Karunathilaka).

P. K. D. Seneviratne wrote the screenplay dealing with Buddhism. It was the second most successful of Peries' first seven films behind Sandesaya. Despite the popularity, Philip Cooray found the film overly emotional and too plotted. It however won a Gandhi Award at Delhi in 1969 and was bought for Irish TV.

Plot
Cyril (Tony Ranasinghe) is dissatisfied with his introverted fiancée Sujatha (Punya Heendeniya). He starts a relationship with the more out-going Sarojini (Anula Karunatilleke) and gets her pregnant. Sujatha meanwhile is fascinated by a wandering Buddhist nun.

Due to the pregnancy, Cyril breaks off the engagement having no intention to marry Sarojini. Till the birth of the child he supports her and then leaves her for an older rich woman. Sarojini is distraught and contemplates suicide. Sujatha by this time is planning to become a nun.

Sujatha takes in Sarojini. By the conclusion, they have switched roles with Sarojini becoming a nun and Sujatha becoming infatuated with a young man.

Cast
 Punya Heendeniya as Sujatha 'Suji' Ratnasooriya
 Tony Ranasinghe as Cyril Elkaduwawa
 Anula Karunathilaka as Sarojini 'Sara'
 Iranganie Serasinghe as Rohini Ratnasooriya 'Amma'
 Dayananda Gunawardena as Senaka Ranatunga
 J. B. L. Gunasekera as Mr. Ratnasooriya 'Thaththa'
 Sobashini Atukorale as Dasasil Mata
 S. A. Jamis as Nonis
 Shanthi Lekha as Sarojini's Amma
 Kithsiri Perera as Sarojini's brother
 D. R. Nanayakkara as Eliyas
 Sujatha Paramanathan as Cyril's lover
 A. P. Gunaratne as Senaka's Thaththa 'Mr. Jayatunga'
 Somi Meegama as Senaka's Amma 'Mrs. Jayatunga'

References

External links
Videos:

1967 films
Films directed by Lester James Peries
Films set in Sri Lanka (1948–present)